This page includes books about Singapore.

Singapore-related lists
Singapore